Mount Karpinskiy is an isolated mountain about  south of Zhelannaya Mountain in the Russkiye Mountains of Queen Maud Land, Antarctica. It was observed and mapped by the Soviet Antarctic Expedition in 1959, and named for geologist A.P. Karpinskiy, President of the Academy of Sciences of the U.S.S.R.

References

Mountains of Queen Maud Land
Princess Astrid Coast